Antonio Vela Vivó (20 March 1872 – 20 January 1950) was a Spanish rower. He competed in two events at the 1900 Summer Olympics.

References

External links

1872 births
1950 deaths
Spanish male rowers
Olympic rowers of Spain
Rowers at the 1900 Summer Olympics
Sportspeople from Menorca
Real Club Marítimo de Barcelona rowers
People from Mahón